Fozeyli (also Romanized as Foẕeylī and Fozeylī; also known as Fizeylī) is a village in Choghamish Rural District, Choghamish District, Dezful County, Khuzestan Province, Iran. At the 2006 census, its population was 848, in 147 families.

References 

Populated places in Dezful County